Group H at the 1998 FIFA World Cup comprised CONMEBOL representatives Argentina, and three World Cup debutants: Croatia, competing from the UEFA confederation; Jamaica of CONCACAF; and Japan from the Asian Football Confederation.

Argentina qualified with a match to spare after they beat Japan and Jamaica with Gabriel Batistuta scoring in both games. Croatia did the same with Davor Šuker scoring in both games. Argentina then beat Croatia to take first place, while Jamaica got their first ever points in a World Cup finals tournament by beating Japan.

Standings

Argentina advanced to play England (runner-up of Group G) in the round of 16.
Croatia advanced to play Romania (winner of Group G) in the round of 16.

Matches

Argentina vs Japan

Jamaica vs Croatia
To date, this is the last match in which both sides were playing their first ever FIFA World Cup fixture.  It was the first time it had happened since 1974, when East Germany played Australia.

Japan vs Croatia

Argentina vs Jamaica

Argentina vs Croatia

Japan vs Jamaica

Group H
Group
Group
Group
Japan at the 1998 FIFA World Cup